In ancient Egyptian religion, Aani is the dog-headed ape sacred to the Egyptian god Thoth. "One of the Egyptian names of the Cynocephalus Baboon, which was sacred to the god Thoth."

The Egyptian hieroglyphic word for "baboon" is jꜥnꜥ in the German style of transliteration.  Attested roughly forty times in extant literature, this word refers to the animal itself.  Many Egyptian gods can manifest in a baboon aspect or have other associations with the animal, including

 Hapy, a god who protects the canopic jar containing the lungs after embalming.
 Khonsu, a god known as “eater of hearts” in the Pyramid Texts.
 Thoth, a god of reason and writing:  “And so the Baboon of Thoth came into being,” says one 18th Dynasty text.

Animal iconography does not imply the Egyptians identified the animals concerned as deities themselves.  Rather, the animal was an icon, or a large hieroglyph, representing a god.

Notes

Egyptian deities
Egyptian legendary creatures